Upper Bridge, also known as the Warsaw Swinging Bridge, is a historic cable suspension bridge located at Warsaw, Benton County, Missouri. It originally opened in 1904 and rebuilt in 1928 after a tornado in 1924. It has a  span between steel towers.

It was listed on the National Register of Historic Places in 1999.

See also

List of bridges documented by the Historic American Engineering Record in Missouri
National Register of Historic Places in Benton County, Missouri

References

External links

Suspension bridges in Missouri
Road bridges on the National Register of Historic Places in Missouri
Bridges completed in 1928
Buildings and structures in Benton County, Missouri
Historic American Engineering Record in Missouri
National Register of Historic Places in Benton County, Missouri
Steel bridges in the United States